Outlaw is a surname. Notable people with the surname include:

Alexander Outlaw (1738–1826), American frontiersman and politician
Arthur R. Outlaw (1926–2000), twice mayor of Mobile, Alabama
Bo Outlaw (born 1971), former National Basketball Association player
Chase Outlaw (born 1993) PBR Bull Rider
Danielle Outlaw (born 1975), Police Commissioner of Philadelphia (since 2020), former Chief of Police for Portland, Oregon (2017-2019)
David Outlaw (1806–1868), U.S. Congressman from North Carolina
George Outlaw (1731–1825), U.S. Congressman from North Carolina; cousin of David Outlaw
Jimmy Outlaw (1913–2006), Major League Baseball player
John Outlaw (born 1945), former National Football League defensive back
Nathan Outlaw (born 1978), English chef and restaurateur
Sam Outlaw (born 1982), American country-western performer, using mother's maiden name
Stetson Outlaw (born 1987) husband, father, and amateur bull fighter 
Travis Outlaw (born 1984), National Basketball Association player